William IV Talvas (1179 – 4 October 1221) was William III, Count of Ponthieu and William IV (of the house of Belleme/Montgomery). He was Count of Ponthieu, ruler of a small province in northern France that fell under the suzerainty of the dukes of Normandy (later also kings of England) since at least the mid 11th century. He was son and heir of John I, Count of Ponthieu (died 1191) by his third wife Beatrice de St Pol.

Family history and background

His father Jean I, Count of Ponthieu (died 1191) was the son of Guy II, Count of Ponthieu (who died on the Second Crusade 1147) and grandson of William III of Ponthieu, also frequently called William III Talvas, and who represented the senior line of the lords of Montgomery, once trusted vassals and allies of William the Conqueror.

Marriage to Alys, Countess of Vexin
Talvas was married on 20 August 1195 to Alys, Countess of Vexin, the daughter of King Louis VII of France. She was some eighteen years older than he, and was said by some to have been seduced by King Henry II of England while betrothed to his son, King Richard the Lionheart. Richard sent her back to her brother, King Philip II of France, refusing to marry his father's mistress. 

Philip then arranged for Alys to marry William Talvas, with the intent that the couple would be childless, and he would thus gain control of Ponthieu, a small but strategically important county. However, Alys then gave birth to a daughter and heiress, Marie, in 1199. This daughter was the maternal grandmother of Eleanor of Castile, first wife of Edward I, King of England, to whom Ponthieu and the disputed Vexin inheritance would eventually pass as Eleanor's dowry. William Talvas died in 1221, his daughter Marie being his heiress.

Life

William was an important army commander in the Anglo-French War (1202–1214).
He also participated in the Albigensian Crusade, particularly in the Siege of Termes in 1210.
He was one of the commanders of the left wing of the French army in the Battle of Bouvines in 1214.

Notes

Sources

Monicat, M.J. Recueil des Actes de Philippe Auguste Roi de France, 1996.

External links
 The First Dynasty of Ponthieu - in French
 The Dynasty of Belleme/Montgomery - in French
 Montgomery family The Montgomery Family, Earls of Shrewsbury albeit with some mistakes, attributing Robert de Belleme's sister-in-law to his first wife.

1179 births
1221 deaths
Counts of Ponthieu
12th-century Normans
13th-century French people